Togetherness is an American comedy-drama television series created by Mark Duplass, Jay Duplass and Steve Zissis. It is written and directed by the Duplass brothers, and stars Mark Duplass, Melanie Lynskey, Amanda Peet and Steve Zissis. The series focuses on themes such as marriage and friendship. The series premiered on HBO on January 11, 2015, and concluded on April 10, 2016, after two seasons and 16 episodes.

Series overview

Episodes

Season 1 (2015)

Season 2 (2016)

References

External links 

Lists of American comedy-drama television series episodes